Rossell is a municipality in the comarca of Baix Maestrat in the Valencian Community, Spain.

The town is located at the eastern end of the Ports de Tortosa-Beseit, in the area known as Muntanyes de Benifassà. Rossell is part of the Taula del Sénia free association of municipalities.

Villages
Bel, aggregated in 1972 and located in the Tinença de Benifassà, 0 inhab. (People come only on weekends or holidays). A lot of people come during local festivals.
Les Cases del Riu, close to La Sénia, 70

References

External links 

 Web Oficial de Rossell.
 Walking trails through the natural park of Tinença de Benifassa
 País Valencià, poble a poble, comarca a comarca, de Paco González Ramírez, d'on se n'ha tret informació amb el seu consentiment.
 Institut Valencià d'Estadística.
 Portal de la Direcció General d'Administració Local de la Generalitat.
 Tinença de Benifassà

Municipalities in the Province of Castellón
Baix Maestrat